The Men's 49er was a sailing event on the Sailing at the 2020 Summer Olympics program in Tokyo and took place between 27 July – 2 August.

The medals were presented by IOC Member for Spain, Mr Juan Antonio Samaranch Jnr. (son of former Olympic President Juan Antonio Samaranch) and World Sailing President Li Quanhai.

Schedule

Results

References 

Men's 49er
49er (dinghy)
Men's events at the 2020 Summer Olympics